is a Japanese volleyball light novel series written by Yukako Kabei and illustrated by Aiji Yamakawa. Shueisha have published five volumes in three seasons since March 2015 under their Shueisha Bunko imprint. A manga adaptation with art by Yamakawa has been serialized in Shueisha's josei manga magazine Cocohana from July to September 2018. An anime television series adaptation by David Production aired from January to March 2021, on the NoitaminA block.

"2.43" refers to the height of the net for male volleyball, 2.43 m.

Characters

Yuni (or Kuroba his teammates call him) is Kimichika's (Chika's) best friend since kindergarten who was originally upset when his best friend moved back in middle school.

Kimichika or Chika is Yuni's best friend since kindergarten. Chika was involved in a scandal at his middle school which caused him to transfer from a prestigious school to the same school as Yuni.

Media

Light novels

Manga

Anime
An anime television series adaptation was announced via Twitter on November 1, 2019. The series is animated by David Production and directed by Yasuhiro Kimura, with Yōsuke Kuroda handling series composition, Yūichi Takahashi designing the characters, and Yugo Kanno composing the music. It aired from January 8 to March 26, 2021, on the NoitaminA programming block. Funimation licensed the series and streamed it on its website in North America and the British Isles, in Europe through Wakanim, and in Australia and New Zealand through AnimeLab. Following Sony's acquisition of Crunchyroll, the series was moved to Crunchyroll.

Notes

References

External links
  
  
 

2015 Japanese novels
2021 anime television series debuts
Anime and manga based on light novels
Aniplex
David Production
Josei manga
Light novels
Crunchyroll anime
Noitamina
Shueisha books
Shueisha manga
Television shows written by Yōsuke Kuroda
Volleyball in anime and manga